Henri Caron (2 July 1924 – 29 April 2002) was a French racewalker. He competed in the men's 50 kilometres walk at the 1948 Summer Olympics.

References

1924 births
2002 deaths
Athletes (track and field) at the 1948 Summer Olympics
French male racewalkers
Olympic athletes of France
Place of birth missing